The UAE Pro League  (known as Etisalat Pro League for sponsorship reasons) is the premier league in United Arab Emirates. It will be the 38th top-level football season in the UAE, and the fifth Professional season.

It will be contested by 14 teams due to an expansion in the league system.

Al Ain are the defending champions, having won the previous 2011–12 Pro League season.

On Thursday, 18 April 2013, Al Ain won their match against Dubai which guarantees them as winners of the 2012–13 Pro League.

They will receive their trophy on their last match against Al Nasr on Saturday, 25 May 2013.

Promotion

In June 2012 the UAE FA announced that the league would expand to 14 clubs The two teams that came in the bottom two of the previous campaign – Al Sharjah and Emirates Club –  would enter a promotion/relegation series with the teams that came third and fourth in the second level – Al Dhafra and Al Shaab Sharjah.

This two sides would join Ittihad Kalba and Dibba Al Fujairah who came in the top two in the second division.

Promotion/relegation play-offs

Teams

Stadia and locations

Managerial changes
Managerial changes during the 2012–13 campaign.

Pre-season

During season

League table

Results

Season statistics

Top scorers

References

External links
 Results, venues, dates and times of matches at official site
 Football Association The UAE Football Association

UAE Pro League seasons
United
1